The Lippach massacre was a war crime committed by the 12th Armored Division of the US Army on 22 April 1945 during the Western Allied invasion of Germany. Some 25 US soldiers from the 3rd Provisional Company killed 36 Waffen-SS prisoners of war and allegedly raped 20 women.

Battle
At noon on 22 April, the 12th Armored Division's 23rd Tank Battalion attacked 300 Waffen-SS troops at the village of Lippach. German artillery, Nebelwerfer, Panzerfaust and small arms fire held the Americans back until 16:00. 36 SS soldiers in total were killed in the battle.

Massacre and mass rape
As the rest of the 23rd Tank Battalion advanced toward Lauchheim, the 3rd Provisional Company came across an alcohol warehouse. Some 25 drunken US soldiers then shot 10 German prisoners of war in the back of the head at a meadow, while six more had their skulls bashed in. Thirty-six Waffen-SS soldiers lost their lives near Lippach, two-thirds of them killed after the battle. The US soldiers proceeded to rape about 20 women in the village.

Citations

Bibliography
 
 

1945 in Germany
Massacres in 1945
World War II prisoner of war massacres by the United States
April 1945 events in Europe
Wartime sexual violence in World War II
Massacres in Germany
Mass murder in 1945